The Southern Conference women's soccer tournament is the conference championship tournament in women's soccer for the Southern Conference. The winner of the tournament receives the conference's automatic bid to the NCAA Division I women's soccer tournament.

Champions

By year

By school

Notes

References

 
NCAA Division I women's soccer conference tournaments